This is a list of listed buildings in Kerteminde Municipality, Denmark.

The list

5290 Marslev

5300 Kerteminde

5370 Mesinge

5380 Dalby

5390 Martofte

5540 Ullerslev

5550 Langeskov

References

External links

 Danish Agency of Culture

 
Furesø